Alan Michael may refer to:

 Alan Michael Braufman (born 1951), American jazz saxophonist, flutist and composer
 Alan Michael (artist) (born 1967), Scottish artist
 Alan Michael (musician) (born 1970), Polish-Dutch singer, songwriter and record producer

See also 
 Alun Michael (born 1943), Welsh politician